is a Prefectural Natural Park in Ehime Prefecture, Japan. Established in 1967, the park spans the borders of the municipalities of Iyo, Kumakōgen, Matsuyama, Tobe, and Tōon.

See also
 National Parks of Japan
 Ishizuchi Quasi-National Park

References

External links
  Detailed map of Saragamine Renpō Prefectural Natural Park

Parks and gardens in Ehime Prefecture
Iyo, Ehime
Kumakōgen, Ehime
Matsuyama, Ehime
Tobe, Ehime
Tōon, Ehime
Protected areas established in 1967
1967 establishments in Japan